Murasoli was a Tamil language newspaper. It was known for its independent line and opposing the Indo-Sri Lanka Accord as did not consult the Tamils. It was founded by  Sinnadurai Thiruchelvam. He was arrested multiple times by the IPKF and his teenage son Ahilan Thiruchelvam  was murdered by the IPKF backed EPRLF. He and his wife went into hiding in Colombo moving from place to place for security. Murasoli was closed down  by the Indian Peace Keeping Force with all its copies confiscated, its journalists and workers arrested and its printing machinery destroyed in 1987.

References

Defunct daily newspapers published in Sri Lanka
Mass media in Jaffna
Tamil-language newspapers published in Sri Lanka
Indian Peace Keeping Force